Marianina khaleesi is a species of sea slugs, a dendronotid nudibranch, a marine gastropod mollusc in the family Tritoniidae.

Etymology
The specific name khaleesi is named after the title "Khaleesi" used by the fictional character Daenerys Targaryen in the fantasy novel series A Song of Ice and Fire. The discoverers chose the name because the silver-colored band on the back of the slug reminded them of the pale blond hair of the character as played by Emilia Clarke in the television adaptation Game of Thrones.

Distribution
Marianina khaleesi was discovered off north-east Brazil in the South Atlantic Ocean and first described in 2013.

Description
It is the only known Tritoniid with a unicuspid rachidian tooth in adult form.

References

External links

Tritoniidae
Gastropods described in 2014